Danijel Bajlo (born 29 June 1973) is a Croatian rower. He competed in the men's double sculls event at the 1996 Summer Olympics.

References

External links
 

1973 births
Living people
Croatian male rowers
Olympic rowers of Croatia
Rowers at the 1996 Summer Olympics
Sportspeople from Zadar